Close Friends  (Italian:  Le amiche del cuore)  is a 1992 Italian teen drama film directed by Michele Placido. It was entered into the Quinzaine des Réalisateurs section at the 1992 Cannes Film Festival.

Cast 
Asia Argento:  Simona
Carlotta Natoli: Morena 
Claudia Pandolfi: Claudia
Michele Placido: Father of Simona
Enrico Lo Verso: Lucio 
Laura Trotter: Letizia
Franco Interlenghi: Tribodi 
Simonetta Stefanelli: Giuliana, mother of Claudia
Orchidea De Santis: Elena, mother of Morena
Ivano De Matteo: Danilo
Enrico Silvestrin: Cameraman

References

External links

1992 films
1992 romantic drama films
Italian romantic drama films
1990s teen drama films
Films directed by Michele Placido
Italian coming-of-age drama films
Films scored by Nicola Piovani
1990s Italian-language films
1990s Italian films